Nitric oxide synthase, inducible is an enzyme which is encoded by the NOS2 gene in humans and mice.

Genetics
Three related pseudogenes are located within the Smith-Magenis syndrome region on chromosome 17. Alternative splicing of this gene results in two transcript variants encoding different isoforms.

Location
Nitric oxide synthase is expressed in epithelial cells of the liver, lung and bone marrow. It is inducible by a combination of lipopolysaccharide and certain cytokines.

Function 
Nitric oxide is a reactive free radical mediating in neurotransmission, antimicrobial and antitumoral activities.
In mice, the function of Nos2 in immunity against a number of viruses, bacteria, fungi, and parasites has been well characterized, whereas in humans the role of NOS2 has remained elusive and controversial. Nos2 is important for protective immunity against CMV. 

Caveolin 1 has been shown to interact with Nitric oxide synthase 2A. and Rac2.

Deficiency
Autosomal recessive NOS2 deficiency has been described in mice. They lack the gene encoding nitric oxide synthase 2 (Nos2) and are susceptible to murine CMV infection.

In February 2020, the same autosomal recessive, complete NOS2 deficiency was described in a human. A 51-year-old previously healthy person died after 29 months of progressive CMV infection due to respiratory failure secondary to CMV pneumonitis, CMV encephalitis, and hemophagocytic lymphohistiocytosis. Whole-exome sequencing on genomic DNA from his blood showed he had homozygous variants in five genes. The only loss-of-function variant was a homozygous frameshift mutation in nitric oxide synthase 2. This condition is extremely rare, occurring in fewer than 1 per million persons.

References 

EC 1.14.13